Doctor Mahboba Hoqooqmal is an Afghan politician.

She was a Law Professor at Kabul University.  
She was appointed to the Emergency Loya Jirga of 2002, serving as its Vice-President.
She also served on the Constitutional Loya Jirga, which sat from 2002 through 2004.
She served on the sixth of its ten committees, chaired by Maulowi Gul Muhammad.
Her committee drafted 22 articles.

During the 2002-2004 period she also served as Minister of State and Presidential Advisor for Women's Affairs for the Afghan Transitional Administration.

References

Living people
Afghan politicians
Year of birth missing (living people)